Pandanadu (also known as Pandavar Nadu) is a village in Chengannur taluk in Alappuzha district, in Kerala, India. According to the 2001 Indian census, Pandanad has a population of 12,466 people.

Geography
A major portion of the village is located on the banks of the Pampa River. The river divides the village into two; Pandanad North and Pandanad West.

Constituent villages
Muthavazhy
Vanmazhy
Keezhuvanmazhy
Pandanad West
Pandanad North
Prayar
Premattakara

Flora
Sugarcane is cultivated in most of the area. However, there are many farms that cultivate pepper, banana, tapioca and coconut palm. Much of the land is rural, and has a rich undergrowth. The more common trees are coconut palms, mahogany and teak.

Boat racing
Pandanadu has 5 Palliyodams (Snake Boats) owned by different "Karas" (locality) viz Pandanad, Keezhuvanmazhy, Vanmazhy, Muthavazhy and Prayar. Among which Keezhuvanmazhy has the biggest one . Keezhuvanmazhy palliyodam was awarded the mannam trophy in 1996, 2015 and second prize in 2008 aranmula utharattati boat race.

Schools
A number of schools are located at both parts of the Pandanad Panchayat. They are Swami Vivekanda Higher Secondary School, R.K.V. L.P. School, M.A.M. School, Govt. JBS Pandanad, Keezhuvanmazhy.

Demographics
In 2001, the Pandanad Panchayat had a total population of 12,466, of which males constituted 47.03% of the population and females 52.97%. Pandanad has an average literacy rate of 85.27%, which is higher than the national average  of 74.02%; with a male literacy of 85% and female literacy of 77%. There are no scheduled tribes in the Pandanad Village, but there are 1921 people belonging to scheduled caste in the village.
Pandanad's two most common religions are Hinduism and Christianity. Pandanad, being a part of Middle Travancore, has been influenced by the Travancore family and the Pandalam royal family, which led to the development of a number of temples in the area, which attracts many devotees from within and outside the state.

Temples
Legends tell of how Pandanad was formed by the Pandavas, hence the name Pandava Nadu. Pandanad had many temples that claim origins from the Pandava. Many of these temples attract residents from surrounding states and are believed to be powerful temples.

List of Temples in and around Pandanad

 Thrikkaippurathu Mahavishnu Temple, Prayar, Pandanad North

Kumaramanglam Subramanyaswami Temple

Kumaramanglam Subramanyaswami Temple in Muthavazhy, Pandanad, Kerala, India is dedicated to Murugan and has great historic and architectural importance. The temple dome is believed to be over 2000 years old and is made from iridium. This temple had been added to the list of protected memorials in India. This temple also claims an ancient snake boat that could hold over 80 people.
Cheruvally Bhgavathy Temple also called Pulipra temple located at the easternmost part of pandanad in Muthavazhy,

Churches 
The Churches in the region hold parentage in the arrival of St.Thomas the Apostle in AD 52. There are a various Christian denominations in the area that maintain more than one church in the region. Maramon Convention (a Christian Convention) was started in Kallissery, a town near the Kadavil Malika. With the rise of the Pentecostal Movement in India, many Marthoma, Orthodox, Pentecostal denominations and churches were also started in the region.

References

External links 
 http://alappuzha.gov.in/

Villages in Alappuzha district